Gilles Christ Sunu (born 30 March 1991) is a professional footballer who plays as a winger for Championnat National club Châteauroux. He has featured for clubs such as Arsenal, Derby County, Lorient, Évian, and Angers. Born in France, Sunu represents Togo internationally.

Career
Sunu was born in Châteauroux, Indre. He began his career at the LB Châteauroux academy, but moved to Arsenal in July 2007 on a four-year contract for a fee between £700,000 and £1 million. At Arsenal whilst playing for the club's academy, Sunu won the FA Youth Cup of 2009 beating Liverpool by 6–2 on aggregate in both legs of the final. He was also victorious in winning the Premier Academy League of 2009 thus helping the club towards an historic youth double.

Arsenal

2009–10 season
Gilles had an impressive first half of the season with Arsenal Reserves, making nine appearances and scoring four goals.
 He made his first team debut for the club when he started a League Cup match against West Bromwich Albion on 22 September 2009, playing 58 minutes before being substituted for Carlos Vela. On 9 December 2009, Sunu made his UEFA Champions League debut in Arsenal's 1–0 away defeat to Olympiacos, coming on for Jack Wilshere on 76 minutes.

Loan to Derby County
On 18 February 2010, Sunu signed for Derby County on loan until the end of the 2009–10 season. He made his debut for the Rams as a first-half substitute in a 1–0 defeat to Swansea City, coming on for the injured Kris Commons before being later substituted on the 85-minute. Sunu scored his first goal in a 4–1 defeat away to Reading on 10 March 2010. After Stephen Pearson and Rob Hulse worked a smart one-two on the left side of the area and when Pearson was halted by a challenge, Sunu poked the loose ball past goalkeeper Adam Federici from the edge of the area. In total, Sunu made nine appearances for Derby before returning to Arsenal slightly earlier than intended after picking up an injury in Derby's penultimate game of the season away to Bristol City.

2010–11 season
After scoring in the final of the 2010 UEFA European Under-19 Football Championship in July, Gilles suffered a cartilage injury in his right knee that would keep him out of action for two months. Sunu made his comeback for the Arsenal Reserves against Blackpool at the end of September and went on to make eight appearances, scoring twice.

Lorient
On 31 January 2011, Sunu opted to join Lorient on loan for the remainder of the 2010–11 campaign. He made his debut for Les Merlus as a second-half substitute in the 2–0 victory over Caen. Gilles created his first assist in the 3–2 away victory to Lens. After rounding Lens goalkeeper Vedran Runje, Sunu flicked the ball back from the byline for Kevin Gameiro to head in from five yards to make the score 2–2. Gilles completed his loan at Lorient making nine appearances, all from the substitutes' bench. Sky Sports reported that Lorient manager Christian Gourcuff was keen to re-sign Sunu as well as his Arsenal teammate Francis Coquelin on an additional year's loan, with Sunu hinting that he would welcome a return to the seaport town.

Gilles Sunu signed a four-year contract with Lorient on 31 August 2011, just three days after being an unused substitute in Arsenal's heavy 8–2 defeat to Manchester United. Sunu made his full debut for Lorient in the 1–1 away draw against Sochaux, coming on as a 62nd-minute substitute for Arnold Mvuemba. On 6 November 2011, Sunu scored his first goal for Lorient and made an assist in the 2–0 home win against Ajaccio. Sunu went past his man and cut the ball back for Yann Jouffre to score from outside the box. Before Jouffre turned provider and played Sunu in on goal with only the keeper to beat. Sunu scored his second goal of the season in the quarter-finals of the Coupe de la Ligue of 2012 in the 1–0 away victory to Le Mans. Gilles beat Le Mans goalkeeper Giorgi Makaridze at the near post on the 70th minute after coming on as a 62nd-minute substitute for Innocent Emeghara.

Évian 
Sunu moved in January 2015 to the Parc des Sports so as to join up with that of Évian in a one and a half year deal. He in all played 10 matches for Les Roses, scoring three goals altogether.

Angers SCO
Sunu went on to leave Evian in the summer of that year so as to link up with fellow Ligue 1 team Angers SCO.

International career
Sunu is a French youth international having earned caps for the under-17s, under-18s, under-19s, under-20s and under-21s. He served as captain throughout the 2008–09 season for the under-19s. During the final of the 2010 UEFA European Under-19 Football Championship, Sunu equalised against Spain to put France on course for a 2–1 victory.

Sunu was named in France under-20's final 21-man squad that competed at the 2011 FIFA U-20 World Cup. He started all seven of France's world cup games, scoring two goals in total as France finished fourth in Colombia.

In September 2018 he switched his international allegiance to Togo, the country of his father Manu. He made his debut for the Togo national football team in a 1–1 2019 Africa Cup of Nations qualification tie with The Gambia on 12 October 2018.

Personal life
Sunu is the son of former Togolese international Manu Sunu.

Career statistics

Club

International goals
Scores and results list Togo's goal tally first.

Honours
Arsenal
FA Youth Cup: 2008–09
Premier Academy League: 2008–09

France U19
UEFA European Under-19 Championship: 2010

References

External links

 
 

1991 births
Living people
People from Châteauroux
Sportspeople from Indre
French footballers
France youth international footballers
France under-21 international footballers
Citizens of Togo through descent
Togolese footballers
Togo international footballers
Association football wingers
LB Châteauroux players
Arsenal F.C. players
Derby County F.C. players
FC Lorient players
Thonon Evian Grand Genève F.C. players
Angers SCO players
Büyükşehir Belediye Erzurumspor footballers
English Football League players
Ligue 1 players
Championnat National 2 players
Championnat National 3 players
Süper Lig players
TFF First League players
French expatriate footballers
Togolese expatriate footballers
Expatriate footballers in England
Expatriate footballers in Turkey
French expatriate sportspeople in England
French expatriate sportspeople in Turkey
Togolese expatriate sportspeople in England
Togolese expatriate sportspeople in Turkey
French sportspeople of Togolese descent
Footballers from Centre-Val de Loire